The 1910 German football championship, the eighth edition of the competition and organised by the German Football Association, was won by Karlsruher FV, defeating Holstein Kiel 1–0 in the final.

For Karlsruher FV it marked the club's sole German championship, having previously lost the 1905 final. The club would go on to play Holstein Kiel again in the 1912 final where the roles would be reversed and Kiel would win 1–0. Kiel, in turn, only made one other final appearance apart from 1910 and 1912, losing the 1930 final to Hertha BSC.

Kiel's Willi Zincke was the top scorer of the 1910 championship with five goals.

Nine teams participated, as holders Phönix Karlsruhe took part in addition to the winners of eight regional football championships. Berlin also sent two teams to the final, the champion of the Verband Berliner Ballspielvereine and the champions of the March football championship.

Qualified teams
The teams qualified through the regional championships:

Competition

Qualifying round

Quarter-finals

Semi-finals

Final

References

Sources
 kicker Allmanach 1990, by kicker, page 160 to 178 – German championship
 Süddeutschlands Fussballgeschichte in Tabellenform 1897-1988  History of Southern German football in tables, publisher & author: Ludolf Hyll

External links
 German Championship 1909–10 at weltfussball.de 
 German Championship 1910 at RSSSF

German football championship seasons
1
German